Saurashtra Cricket Association Stadium,  also known as the Khandheri Cricket Stadium, is a cricket stadium in Rajkot, India. It is Gujarat's first solar-powered stadium.

In 2013, the first international match took place in this stadium. The host (India) played ODI against England. In same year, it hosted its first T20I between India and Australia which India won by six wickets. In 2016, this stadium hosted its first Test, India vs England. Although, the Test match ended in a draw.

History

Initially, the stadium was being used for Ranji Trophy matches, when the spectator stands were still being constructed. With the stands completed, the ground can hold 28,000 people. The stadium is a part of a larger sports complex that will include venues for other sports such as badminton, basketball, and volleyball. It will host Saurashtra Cricket Association matches along with Madhavrao Scindia Cricket Ground.

It is a state of the art cricket stadium. The media box here is similar in design to the one at Lord's Cricket Ground, London. To facilitate spectator movement, there are several aisles between seat columns and the many entrances/exits for the three stands. There is also a spacious passage running around the stadium, between the stands and the outer wall, to enable easy movement.

A 30-acre portion of agricultural land next to the Jamnagar highway was acquired around 2004. Construction began in 2006 and the total cost, including land, is said to be around Rs 75 crore (around $14 million). The SCA shifted its offices from the cramped seventh floor of a commercial building in the city to the stadium which has been hosting first-class matches since late 2008.

The complex has two playing fields: the main one inside the stadium, with a 90-yard outfield, and a smaller one outside, with a 70-yard outfield. The latter is used for outdoor nets, and also for district-level matches. The dressing rooms are big and lined with large, luxurious, cushioned seats.

There are more than 60 hospitality boxes dotting the West Stand and the Pavilion Stand but the SCA has decided against selling them permanently to corporates and will only hire them out for international matches. There are even plans to have an academy in the future.

The stadium was in the cricket news when its Saurashtra run machines Cheteshwar Pujara and Ravindra Jadeja make their latest double or triple-hundred.

It also hosted its first T20 International match on 10 October 2013 between India and Australia during the Australia Tour of India Oct-Nov 2013. The match first saw Aaron Finch make 89 and then the return of Yuvraj Singh to international cricket in which he scored an unbeaten 77 as India chased down 201 runs.

In November 2015, the stadium was selected as one of the six new Test venues along with Maharashtra Cricket Association Stadium, JSCA International Stadium Complex, Holkar Stadium, Himachal Pradesh Cricket Association Stadium and Dr. Y.S. Rajasekhara Reddy ACA-VDCA Cricket Stadium in India.
The stadium was the home ground of the Gujarat Lions in IPL 2016. It hosted five matches in the season.

On 9 November 2016, the stadium hosted its first Test match, which was played between England and India.

List of centuries

Key
 * denotes that the batsman was not out.
 Inns. denotes the number of the innings in the match.
 Balls denotes the number of balls faced in an innings.
 NR denotes that the number of balls was not recorded.
 Parentheses next to the player's score denotes his century number at Edgbaston.
 The column title Date refers to the date the match started.
 The column title Result refers to the player's team result

Tests

One Day Internationals

Twenty20 Internationals

List of five-wicket hauls

Key

Tests

References

External links
 Saurashtra Cricket Association Stadium at ESPNcricinfo
 Saurashtra Cricket Association Stadium at CricketArchive

Buildings and structures in Rajkot
Cricket grounds in Saurashtra (region)
Sports venues completed in 2008
2008 establishments in Gujarat
Test cricket grounds in India